Jonathan Scherzer (born 22 July 1995) is an Austrian professional footballer who plays as left-back for Wolfsberger AC.

Career
Scherzer was born in Spittal an der Drau, Carinthia, Austria, and began his footballing career at Spittal/Drau in 2001. His father, a veterinarian, was offered a position as a professor at the University of Georgia, and he moved with his family to the United States, joined the Athens United youth teams in 2008. From there he moved to Borussia Mönchengladbach in Germany and later 1860 Munich.

In January 2018, Scherzer joined FC Admira Wacker Mödling.

On 20 May 2020, he signed with Wolfsberger AC.

References

External links
 Jonathan Scherzer at Admira Wacker

1995 births
Living people
People from Spittal an der Drau
Footballers from Carinthia (state)
Austrian footballers
Austrian expatriate footballers
Austrian Football Bundesliga players
Austrian Regionalliga players
Regionalliga players
FC Augsburg II players
FC Admira Wacker Mödling players
Wolfsberger AC players
Association football defenders
Austrian expatriate sportspeople in the United States
Austrian expatriate sportspeople in Germany
Expatriate soccer players in the United States
Expatriate footballers in Germany